Ulrich Stuhler is a German mathematician. He currently is a professor at the University of Göttingen. He is known for his contributions to the Langlands program. In 1993, he—along with Gérard Laumon and Michael Rapoport—proved the local Langlands conjectures  for the general linear group GLn(K) for positive characteristic local fields K.

An alumnus of the University of Göttingen, Stuhler earned his doctorate under supervision of Martin Kneser in 1970.

References

External links
 
 Website at the University of Göttingen

Year of birth missing (living people)
Living people
20th-century German mathematicians
University of Göttingen alumni
Academic staff of the University of Göttingen
21st-century German mathematicians